Bredäng is a district of Söderort, Stockholm, Sweden. In the southwest section of the city, it is a part of the Skärholmen borough and is named after a former farm in the area. Bredäng has an 18th-century mansion (Jakobsbergs gård) named after its first owner, Jacob Graver. Bredäng consists predominantly of 1960s apartment blocks and has a camping site by the lake Mälaren.

The population of Bredäng is 9,266. 60.4% of the population had a foreign background.

See also
 Bredäng metro station

Districts of Stockholm